The International High School of the Gothenburg Region (IHGR) is a municipal high school in the Västra Götaland county, Sweden. The school was founded in 2001. The first students began studying there 19 August that same year. All classes except for Swedish are taught in English, the official language of the school, but a Swedish curriculum is followed. The school has its own library. Since IHGR is an international school, there are students studying there from different countries; as many as 15 nationalities are represented. These nationalities had the chance to be presented at project days that the school organizes called "The world culture days", which does not exist anymore. These were held every year by second graders from the school, at Casino Cosmopol in Gothenburg city. The school is located in the heart of Gothenburg, sharing a building together with the primary international school, ISGR (International School of the Gothenburg region). 
IHGR is a relatively small school with 370 students and 25 teachers.

Programs
 Social Science
 English PACE
 Natural Science
 International Baccalaureate

Most students study at IHGR as preparation for further studies abroad. Approximately 20 % of all the students study abroad when done with high school education, a few of them in England. Around 80 % of the remaining students study in Sweden.

References 
 
 
 
http://www.ihgr.se/Nat.html
http://www.ihgr.se/social.html

Schools in Sweden